Miracle in Harlem is a 1948 American film directed by Jack Kemp and starred an all African American cast.

Plot

A young woman is suspected of killing the business magnate who swindled her out of her family run candy business.

Cast
 Sheila Guyse as Julie Weston
 Hilda Offley as Aunt Hattie
 William Greaves as Bert Hallam
 Creighton Thompson as Reverend Jackson
 Lawrence Criner as Albert Marshall (father)
 Sybil Lewis as Alice Adams 
 Kenneth Freeman as Jim Marshall (son)
 Jack Carter as Phillip Manley
 Milton Williams as Mr. Wilkinson
 Monte Hawley as Lieutenant Renard
 Alfred "Slick" Chester as Detective Tracy (as Alfred Chester)
 Ruble Blakey as Detective Foley
 Stepin Fetchit as Swifty the Handyman

Specialties Acts (as featured on the soundtrack)
 Creighton Thompson as Singer, 'A Preaching Song'
Savannah Churchill as Singer, 'I Want be Loved'
 Lavada Carter as Singer,  'John Saw the Number'
 Norma Shepherd as Singer,  'Patience & Fortitude'
Sheila Guyse as Singer, 'Look Down That Lonesome Road'
Juanita Hall as Singer, 'Chocolate Candy Blues'
 Lynn Proctor Trio as Lynn Proctor Trio Singers  'Watch Out'
 Juanita Hall Choir as Juanita Hall Choir, performing 'Swing Low, Sweet Chariot' & 'Nearer My God To Thee' 
 Hilda Geeley as Singer (uncredited)

References

External links
 
Miracle in Harlem at TCMDB
Miracle in Harlem at BFI
 Miracle in Harlem (1948) - Jack Kemp | Synopsis, Characteristics, Moods, Themes and Related | AllMovie
 
Complete film at YouTube

1948 films
1948 crime drama films
American crime drama films
American black-and-white films
Films set in Harlem
Race films
Lippert Pictures films
1940s English-language films
1940s American films